The 1977–78 Egyptian Premier League, was the 21st season of the Egyptian Premier League, the top Egyptian professional league for association football clubs, since its establishment in 1948. The season started on 17 September 1977 and concluded on 2 April 1978.
Zamalek managed to win the league for the 4th time in the club's history.

League table

 (C)= Champion, (R)= Relegated, Pld = Matches played; W = Matches won; D = Matches drawn; L = Matches lost; F = Goals for; A = Goals against; ± = Goal difference; Pts = Points.

Top goalscorers

Teams location

References

External links 
 All Egyptian Competitions Info

5
1977–78 in African association football leagues
1977–78 in Egyptian football